Jack Patterson may refer to:

Jack Patterson (American politician) (1890–1971), American politician in North Dakota
Jack Patterson (Canadian politician) (1884–1964), Canadian politician, member of the House of Commons of Canada
Jack Patterson (Clean Bandit), English musician, member of the band Clean Bandit
Jack Patterson (footballer) (1911-1994), Australian rules footballer 
Jack Patterson (River City), fictional character

See also
Jack Paterson (born 1974), Canadian director, dramaturg, actor and theatre creator
Jack Paterson (footballer) (1900-1975), Australian rules footballer
John Patterson (disambiguation)